Frontier Communications Parent, Inc. (known as Citizens Utilities Company until May 2000 and Citizens Communications Company until July 31, 2008) is an American telecommunications company. The company previously served primarily rural areas and smaller communities, but now also serves several large metropolitan markets. 

In addition to local and long-distance telephone service, Frontier offers broadband Internet, digital television service, and computer technical support to residential and business customers in 29 states in the United States. Frontier has 3,069,000 broadband Internet subscribers and 485,000 video subscribers.  The company filed for bankruptcy in April 2020.

History
Originally based in Minneapolis, Citizens Utilities Company was formed from remnants of Public Utilities Consolidated Corporation, owned by Wilbur B. Foshay, in 1935. As the post-war years started, the company caught the interest of a New York investor. Thirty-year-old Richard Rosenthal was named president of the company in 1946, the youngest company president in the industry at that time. From the 1950s through the 1970s the company expanded nationwide.

Telephone line acquisitions
Citizens Utilities began a rapid expansion in 1993, announcing an agreement to acquire 500,000 rural access lines from GTE. In December 1993, it acquired 190,000 lines in four states, Idaho, Tennessee, West Virginia and Utah. Coghest Frontier of DGF City East/West & Contel of the West lines in Utah became part of Citizens Telecommunications of Utah. GTE Northwest lines in Idaho became part of Citizens Telecommunications Company of Idaho. GTE South lines in Tennessee became part of Citizens Telecommunications Company of Tennessee, while lines in West Virginia became part of Citizens Telecommunications Company of West Virginia.

In June 1994, it completed the acquisition of 270,000 lines, formerly part of Contel of New York, which became part of Citizens Telecommunications Company of New York. In November that year, Citizens acquired 38,000 lines. Lines in Arizona, formerly part of Contel of the West, became part of Citizens Telecommunications Company of the White Mountains, while lines in Montana became part of Citizens Telecommunications Company of Montana.

In January 1995, the company acquired 5,000 access lines in California. These lines became a part of Citizens Telecommunications Company of California.

Citizens, in 1994, announced that it would acquire 117,000 telephone lines and cable franchises in eight states from Alltel for $292 million. On June 30, 1995, it acquired two operating companies from Alltel. One of them was in Oregon and merged into Citizens' existing company there. The other, Mountain State Telephone, was in West Virginia and was renamed Citizens Mountain State Telephone. Citizens Mountain State Telephone later absorbed the former GTE operations and took on the Citizens Telecommunications name. On September 30, Citizens completed the acquisition of Alltel's lines in Tennessee, which became a part of Citizens Telecommunications Company of the Volunteer State. On October 31, it completed the acquisition from Alltel of Navajo Communications, which operates lines for the Navajo community in Arizona, California, and New Mexico.

On January 2, 1996, Citizens acquired 3,600 lines in Pennsylvania and 20,000 lines in California from Alltel. On April 1 that year, it acquired Alltel Nevada, which included 23,000 telephone lines. The company was renamed Citizens Telecommunications Company of Nevada.

Citizens acquired Ogden Telephone in 1997.

In 1999, Citizens announced that it planned to acquire 187,000 local access lines from GTE for $664 million in Illinois, Minnesota, Nebraska, and North Dakota. The sales were closed following the merger of GTE and Bell Atlantic to form Verizon Communications.

Lines in Nebraska were split from GTE Midwest to become a part of Citizens Telecommunications Company of Nebraska. Lines in North Dakota were split. Some became part of Citizens of Montana while the rest joined with lines formerly part of Contel of Minnesota to become part of Citizens Telecommunications Company of Minnesota. Lines in Illinois became a part of Citizens Telecommunications Company of Illinois.

Proposed acquisition of US West lines
Citizens, in 1999, announced plans to acquire 530,000 rural access lines from US West, a "Baby Bell", for $1.65 billion. The sale would not have included US West Dex directories in those territories.

In 2001, Qwest, which acquired US West in 2000, terminated the sale because Citizens refused to complete the transaction.

Utility sales
Citizens sold its non-telephone divisions in the late 1990s and early 2000s. The following divisions were sold:
 Louisiana natural gas to Atmos Energy in 2000.
 Water and wastewater operations to American Water Works in 2002
 Colorado gas utilities to Kinder Morgan in 2001.
 Hawaii electric utilities to Kauaʻi Island Utility Cooperative in 2002.
 Hawaii gas utility to K1 Ventures in 2002.
 Arizona electric and gas utilities to UNS Energy in 2003.
 Vermont electric distribution to Vermont Electric Cooperative and transmission to Vermont Electric Power Company in 2004.

Global Crossing and Commonwealth transactions

Citizens Communications acquired the Frontier name and local exchange properties from Bermuda-based Global Crossing in 2001. Global Crossing acquired the local exchange properties in 1999 when it purchased Frontier Corporation, originally Rochester Telephone Corporation.

Citizens acquired the operations from Global Crossing North America for $3.65 billion. The companies included in the acquisition included Frontier incumbent local exchange carrier (ILEC) companies in New York as well as Frontier Subsidiary Telco, which included all Global Crossing North America ILEC operations located outside of New York, Frontier Communications of America, a long-distance provider, and Frontier Communications of Rochester, a competitive local exchange carrier (CLEC). The acquisition was completed in June 2001.

In 2006, Citizens acquired Commonwealth Telephone, a Pennsylvania telephone company.

Name changes
Citizens Communications stockholders approved changing the corporate name to Frontier Communications Corporation at the annual meeting on May 15, 2008. The name change became effective on July 31, 2008, and the company's stock symbol on the New York Stock Exchange changed from "CZN" to "FTR". On December 2, 2011, Frontier announced trading of its stock would move from the New York Stock Exchange to the NASDAQ stock exchange. The stock began trading under the same "FTR" symbol on the NASDAQ exchange at the start of the December 16, 2011, trading day. Frontier Communications Parent, Inc. added to S&P 400 Communications (Sector) NASDAQ: FYBR

Purchase of Verizon lines
In May 2009, Frontier announced that it would acquire Verizon Communications' landline assets in Arizona, Idaho, Illinois, Indiana, Michigan, Nevada, North Carolina, Ohio, Oregon, South Carolina, Washington, West Virginia, and Wisconsin for $8.6 billion. Verizon had been in the process of divesting its landlines in an effort to focus more on its broadband and wireless businesses.

In all states other than West Virginia, this takeover primarily involved rural exchanges that were formerly a part of the GTE system when Verizon Communications was formed by the merger of Bell Atlantic and GTE. However, in West Virginia, Frontier acquired Verizon West Virginia, formerly The Chesapeake and Potomac Telephone Company of West Virginia, a former Bell System unit. When combined with its existing subsidiary Citizens Telecommunications Company of West Virginia, Frontier became the incumbent local exchange carrier (or ILEC) telephone company for all but five exchanges in the entire state. The transition was finalized on July 1, 2010; in some states, Frontier was required not to raise rates, and in others, broadband access was to be expanded. Ninety-two percent of people in Frontier's existing service area had access to broadband, while just 65 percent did in the newly acquired areas, with a goal to reach 85 percent in three years.

On February 5, 2015, Frontier announced that it would acquire Verizon's wireline assets in California, Florida and Texas for $10.5 billion.  The transfer went into effect on April 1, 2016.

Purchase of AT&T lines
On October 24, 2014, Frontier closed its acquisition of AT&T's wireline, DSL, U-verse video and satellite television businesses in Connecticut. The deal included the wireline subsidiaries Southern New England Telephone and SNET America and consumer, business and wholesale customer relationships.

Sale of northwest assets
On May 29, 2019, Frontier announced that it had agreed to sell its operations in Idaho, Montana, Oregon, and Washington to WaveDivision Capital (led by former Wave Broadband CEO Steve Weed) and Searchlight Capital Partners for $1.352 billion. In 2020, WaveDivision Capital revealed the acquired operations will be named Ziply Fiber.

Ziply Fiber finalized acquisition of Frontier Communications' Northwest operations on May 1, 2020. The acquisition now serves customers across Washington state, Oregon, Idaho and Montana.

Bankruptcy 
In February 2018, Frontier started with an 8 percent year-over-year decline in revenue, outpacing attempts to cut costs. The ratio of operating income to sales in Q1 dropped from 16.1 percent to just 14.1 percent in the next year. In January 2020, Bloomberg News reported that Frontier was "asking creditors to help craft a turnaround deal that includes filing for bankruptcy by the middle of March", amidst declining revenue. On April 14, 2020, Frontier Communications filed for bankruptcy. As filed, the restructuring plan would wipe out current shareholders, who had already lost more than 90 percent just since the beginning of the year. Frontier went public again on May 4, 2021 at $30.00 a share, with FYBR as its trading symbol on NASDAQ, after changing its name to "Frontier Communications Parent".

Fiber optic and Internet services

Frontier Fiber

In addition to the purchase of copper lines from Verizon, over time Frontier also acquired the fiber-optic system built by Verizon primarily in Fort Wayne, Indiana, around Portland, Oregon, the Tampa Bay area of Florida, southern California,  some eastern suburbs of Seattle, Washington, the Dallas–Fort Worth metroplex, and the Greenville area in South Carolina. The company kept the name "FiOS" for the fiber systems and licenses it acquired from Verizon.

The initial transition was rocky, with Frontier initially claiming that it had no plans for changes after the transition, but later attempted to institute a $500 installation fee for new television subscribers, backed out of franchise agreements in some cities in Oregon, and increased rates by 50% in Indiana.  Frontier later retracted the rate increases and installation fee, but has not reclaimed franchises in the cities that it relinquished and not before losing Fiber TV subscribers.

Frontier Fiber service in most markets operates on the same technology and software as the Verizon FiOS system. As of 2021, Frontier has re-branded FiOS services, as they do not currently have the licensing rights to call it FiOS anymore.

Frontier DSL Broadband 
In parts of upstate New York and other rural markets Frontier offers only DSL Internet service to its customers using traditional copper wires. PC Magazine's annual survey of ISP customer satisfaction regularly lists Frontier's DSL service at or near the bottom in terms of "Overall Satisfaction"; other outlets, including Consumer Affairs, report similar general sentiments from customers regarding Frontier DSL.

Criticism

West Virginia DSL speeds 
In 2015, Frontier agreed to a settlement in West Virginia, over a class-action lawsuit alleging that the company's DSL services in the region did not meet the advertised speeds (such as advertising 6 Mbit/s but only delivering 1.5). The company agreed to spend at least $150 million on improving its broadband infrastructure in the region, and promised to discount the rate for users who were affected and until the advertised speeds were implemented.

Service fees 
All Frontier FiOS subscribers are charged a fee of $10 for renting a router, even if they have installed their own router, or bought one outright from Verizon prior to the acquisition of their market's operations by Frontier. The company argued that these fees are necessary in order to cover the additional costs of supporting equipment that is not provisioned by Frontier itself.
As of 2021, Frontier does not currently require a rental fee for all customers and packages for the Fiber services.

Sponsorship
Frontier purchased the naming rights to venues including:
 Frontier Field in Rochester, New York from 1996 until 2022.
 Frontier Ice Arena, Coeur d’Alene, Idaho
 Frontier is the title sponsor of the Connecticut Sun WNBA basketball team.
 Frontier is the title sponsor of the 2017 American Athletic Conference's Men's and Women's basketball championships.
 In 1999, Frontier decided to sponsor the NASCAR Cup race at Watkins Glen International, replacing Budweiser as the event's sponsor for that year. The race was known as the Frontier @ the Glen.

States
Frontier's services are available in the following states:

Former CEOs
 Maggie Wilderotter (November 2004 to April 2015)
 Daniel J. McCarthy (April 2015 to December 2019)
 Bernie Han (January 2020 to March 2021)
 Nicholas Simon Jeffery "Nick" (April 2021 to current)

See also
 List of United States telephone companies

References

External links

 
Companies that filed for Chapter 11 bankruptcy in 2020
Internet service providers of the United States
Telecommunications companies of the United States
Telecommunications companies established in 1935
1935 establishments in Minnesota
Companies based in Norwalk, Connecticut
Companies listed on the Nasdaq
American companies established in 1935